WDOR may refer to:
 WDOR (AM), a radio station (910 AM) licensed to Sturgeon Bay, Wisconsin, United States
 WDOR-FM, a radio station (93.9 FM) licensed to Sturgeon Bay, Wisconsin, United States